"T-Shirt" is a trap song by American hip hop group Migos. It impacted radio on February 14, 2017 as the second single from their second studio album Culture (2017). The song was produced by American production duo Nard & B, alongside their TrenchWerk cohort XL. The song peaked in the top 20 of the US Billboard Hot 100, and has acquired 336 million YouTube views and 415 million Spotify plays as of February 2022.

Music critic Simon Reynolds praised "T-Shirt" as "vocal alchemy via Auto-Tune, turning profane tales of fast lane life into a holy trance, a choral weave of glistening rap, ecstatic ad libs, and a wordless backing ripple of Gregorian gurgles and droning moans."

Music video
The music video for the song, directed by DAPS and Quavo, features the trio dressed as Arctic hunters in fur and Versace snow boots, with snowmobiles, spears and practicing archery, alongside three women. It was filmed at a mountain range near Lake Tahoe. The video premiered on January 6, 2017 via Migos' YouTube channel.

Live performances
On March 23, 2017, Migos performed "T-Shirt", alongside The Roots, on The Tonight Show Starring Jimmy Fallon.

Charts

Weekly charts

Year-end charts

Certifications

Release history

References

External links

2017 songs
Migos songs
300 Entertainment singles
Song recordings produced by Nard & B
Atlantic Records singles
2017 singles
Songs written by Quavo
Songs written by Offset (rapper)
Songs written by Takeoff (rapper)
Trap music songs